PingPong is an Israeli pop quartet that represented Israel in the Eurovision Song Contest in 2000 with the song Sameach (lit. Happy).

The members of the band were: Guy Assif, Ahal Eden, Roy Arad and Yifat Giladi. The band released one album Between Moral and Fashion (2000, Hed Arzi) with songs like "Burger Ranch" (Israeli chain of fastfood restaurants), "I got a lover in Givati" and "Mr. Israel". This album sells only about 1000 copies.

Their hit song "Sameach" (Hebrew for "Happy") was admitted to the 2000 Eurovision Song Contest. At the close of voting the song had received 7 points, placing 22nd in a field of 24. The song lyrics mentioned a friend from Damascus who dates an Israeli girl. The band was sanctioned by the Israel Broadcasting Authority after waving the flag of Syria during the rehearsal and the video-clip of the song. They refused to back down for the performance in the final and pulled the flag out live, Ehud Barak was negotiating at the time. They also visited a Syrian community center in Stockholm, where the Eurovision was held. The song was covered by the band Beer7, a punk band whose vocalist is Roy's younger sister.

The band was the favourite of the NME magazine for winning the contest, but failed.

In 2006, a documentary called "Sipur Sameach" made by filmmaker Alon Weinstock was released on DVD, following the group's trip to Sweden.

References

External links

 Burger Ranch YouTube

Eurovision Song Contest entrants for Israel
Eurovision Song Contest entrants of 2000
Israeli pop music groups
Musical groups established in 1999
1999 establishments in Israel